Stračinci is a village in the municipality of Gazi Baba, North Macedonia.

Demographics
According to the 2021 census, the village had a total of 1.136 inhabitants. Ethnic groups in the village include:
Albanians 775
Macedonians 341
Turks 1
Others 19

References

External links

Villages in Gazi Baba Municipality
Albanian communities in North Macedonia